The Chornaya tubenose goby (Proterorhinus tataricus) is a species of goby endemic to Crimea, Ukraine where it is only found in a short stretch of River Chornaya.  Water is extracted in large quantities for irrigation could cause the stream to completely dry out in summer and thus poses a critical risk of extinction in a near future.

References

External links
Photograph at Arkive

Chornaya tubenose goby
Endemic fauna of Crimea
Freshwater fish of Europe
Chornaya tubenose goby
Chornaya tubenose goby
Taxa named by Alexander Mikhailovich Naseka